Next Door may refer to:

Film
 Next Door (1975 film), a short film adaptation of a story by Kurt Vonnegut (see below)
 Next Door, a 1990 animated short film by Pete Docter
 Next Door (1994 film), an American black comedy TV movie
 Next Door (2005 film) (Naboer), a Norwegian psychological thriller
 Next Door (2021 film), a German black comedy-drama film

Other uses
 "Next Door", a 1955 short story by Kurt Vonnegut
 Next Door, a 1983 EP by Boy, a band featuring Freddy Moore
 Next Door, an American convenience store chain owned by GPM Investments
 Nextdoor, a social networking service

See also

 
 Two Doors Down (disambiguation)
 3 Doors Down (disambiguation)
 Next (disambiguation)
 Neighbor (disambiguation)
 Boy Next Door (disambiguation)
 Girl Next Door (disambiguation)